is a railway station in the city of Toyokawa, Aichi Prefecture, Japan, operated by Central Japan Railway Company (JR Tōkai).

Lines
Tōjō Station is served by the Iida Line, and is located 17.0 kilometers from the southern terminus of the line at Toyohashi Station.

Station layout
The station has two opposed side platforms connected by a footbridge. The station building is unattended.

Platforms

Adjacent stations

|-
!colspan=5|Central Japan Railway Company

Station history
Tōjō Station was established on April 25, 1898 as a station on the now-defunct . On August 1, 1943, the Toyokawa Railway was nationalized, along with some other local lines to form the Japanese Government Railways (JGR) Iida Line.  Scheduled freight operations were discontinued in 1963. The station has been unattended since February 1984. Along with its division and privatization of JNR on April 1, 1987, the station came under the control and operation of the Central Japan Railway Company (JR Tōkai).  A new station building was completed in January 2007.

Passenger statistics
In fiscal 2017, the station was used by an average of 167 passengers daily.

Surrounding area
Japan National Route 151

See also
 List of Railway Stations in Japan

References

External links

Railway stations in Japan opened in 1898
Railway stations in Aichi Prefecture
Iida Line
Stations of Central Japan Railway Company
Toyokawa, Aichi